Melvyn P. "Mel" Nowell (born December 27, 1939) is an American former basketball player.

Born in Columbus, Ohio, Nowell played for the Ohio State Buckeyes basketball team that won the 1960 NCAA championship. He played with three Hall of Famers and Hall of Fame Coach Fred Taylor. He later played in the National Basketball Association (NBA) for the Chicago Zephyrs and in the American Basketball Association (ABA).

A 6'1 guard, Nowell was a high school star at Columbus East 1957–1958. His outside shooting and one-on-one skills were enough to rate him the #2 player in Ohio after Jerry Lucas. Fielding numerous scholarship offers, Nowell decided to follow Lucas to Ohio State in a historic recruiting class that later also included John Havlicek and Bobby Knight. Starting with fellow sophomores Lucas and Havlicek, Nowell's shooting was a key element in Ohio State's run to the 1960 NCAA title. He was named to the 1960 All-Tournament Team.

Ohio State's 1960–61 team went undefeated until the NCAA Final. Ohio State's 1961–62 also reached the NCAA Final.

Nowell did participate in the 1960 US Olympic Trials but was never seriously considered for a spot on the team. Only three blacks were named to that team, and more attention was paid to Nowell's white Ohio State teammates, a factor he considered in his remaining basketball career.

Nowell's shooting ability was such that he could have been a big scorer at another school, a fact that could have led to a bigger pro career. Instead, he played with or for four future Hall of Famers, went to three straight NCAA Finals, winning one in 1960. All three years, the Ohio State Buckeyes were undefeated at home at St. John Arena.

External links
NBA and ABA statistics

1939 births
Living people
American men's basketball players
Basketball players from Columbus, Ohio
Chicago Zephyrs draft picks
Chicago Zephyrs players
New Jersey Americans players
Ohio State Buckeyes men's basketball players
Point guards
Shooting guards
Wilkes-Barre Barons players